Following are notable people who were either born/raised or have lived for a significant period of time in the Binghamton, New York area:

Academics and scientists
 David A. Ansell, physician and author
 Herbert P. Bix, historian
 Albert Boime, art historian
 Ruth Britto, mathematician
 Anne Case, economist
 Edith Katherine Cash, mycologist and lichenologist
 Willard N. Clute, botanist
 Norman Finkelstein, political scientist, attended Binghamton University
 Peter Hilton, mathematician
 Thomas Hopko, former dean of Saint Vladimir’s Orthodox Theological Seminary
 Mike Hudak, environmental researcher
 Peter Kogge, computer engineer, IBM Fellow
 Edwin A. Link, engineer, inventor of the flight simulator
 Tom M. Mitchell, computer scientist
 Paul Olum, mathematician
 Camille Paglia, author, teacher, social critic
 Ota Ulč, political scientist
 Peter Ungar, paleoanthropologist
 Immanuel Wallerstein, sociologist
 M. Stanley Whittingham, chemist, recipient of the 2019 Nobel Prize in Chemistry
 David Sloan Wilson, evolutionary biologist

Actors and entertainers
 Charlie Ahearn, film director
 Rick Baker, makeup artist
 William Baldwin, actor, attended Binghamton University
 Andrew Bergman, screenwriter, attended Binghamton University
 Alan Berliner, filmmaker, attended Binghamton University
 Dick Biondi, disc jockey
 John Conboy, Emmy-winning soap opera producer
 Stephanie Courtney, actress and comedian, attended Binghamton University
 Jeremy Davidson, actor
 Richard Deacon, actor
 Angel Desai, actress
 John Ducey, TV actor
 Shareeka Epps, actress
 Darlanne Fluegel, actress, model
 Helen Gardner, actress and producer of silent black and white film
 Anthony George, soap opera actor
 Hugh Herbert, comedian
 Jim Hutton, actor
 Bill T. Jones, Tony Award-winning choreographer, attended Binghamton University
 Jasmine Kennedie, drag performer
 Andy Kindler, comedian, attended Binghamton University
 Tony Kornheiser, sports commentator, sportswriter, attended Binghamton University
 Mark Lawrence, writer and filmmaker, attended Binghamton University
 Jessica Lee, model, Playboy Playmate, August 1996
 Carol Leifer, comedian, writer, attended Binghamton University
 Wilbur Mack, actor
 Ernie Manouse, anchorman
 Leonard Melfi, playwright and actor
 Bridget Moynahan, model, actress
 Matt Nolan, Broadway actor, attended Binghamton University
 Tony Northrup, video producer, author, and photographer
 Stanley J. Orzel, film director
 Stephen Park, comedian, actor
 Karl Ravech, ESPN personality, attended Binghamton University
 Paul Reiser, comedian, actor, writer, screenwriter, attended Binghamton University
 Avis Richards, film director, producer
 Ruben Santiago-Hudson, actor, Tony Award winner, attended Binghamton University
 Amy Sedaris, comedian and actress
 Rod Serling, writer, television producer, creator of The Twilight Zone TV series
 Jackie Siegel, model, actress
 Karthik Sivakumar, actor, attended Binghamton University
 Madeleine Smithberg, co-creator of The Daily Show, attended Binghamton University
 Roger Watkins, writer, director, producer, actor
 Chris Wedge, film director
 David Weisman, film director 
 Sam Weisman, Emmy-nominated TV director
 Volkmar Wentzel, photographer and cinematographer for National Geographic
 John Wilson, filmmaker, attended Binghamton University
 Mark Withers, actor

Artists and architects
 Renata Bernal, visual artist
 Orlando Busino, illustrator
 Johnny Hart, cartoonist, creator of comic strips B.C. and The Wizard of Id
 John Marshall, artist for comic strip Blondie
 Charles McGill, sculptor
 Jerry Moriarty, artist and cartoonist
 Marla Olmstead, painter 
 Brant Parker, cartoonist, co-creator of The Wizard of Id
 Isaac G. Perry, architect
 Art Spiegelman, illustrator, best known for his Pulitzer Prize-winning comic book memoir Maus, attended Binghamton University
 C. Edward Vosbury, architect
 Ed Wilson, sculptor

Athletes and athletics personnel
 Joel Bennett, baseball player
 Tyler Biggs, hockey player
 Dave Bliss, basketball coach
 Dan Casey, baseball player
 Cathy Compton, softball coach
 Mike Coolbaugh, baseball coach
 Scott Coolbaugh, baseball player
 Jerry D'Amigo, hockey player
 Babe Danzig, baseball player
 Wink Davenport, volleyball player and official
 Scott Diamond, baseball player, attended Binghamton University
 Alec Dufty, soccer player
 Mike Dunham, hockey player
 Diane Farrell, tennis player
 George Feigenbaum, basketball player
 Billy Gabor, basketball player
 Rob Gardner, baseball player
 Barry Goldstein, golf instructor
 Bobby Gonzalez, basketball coach
 Bill Hallahan, baseball player
 Gerry Hannahs, baseball player
 Jim Johnson, baseball player
 Arthur Jones, football player
 Chandler Jones, football player
 DaQuan Jones, football player
 Jon Jones, mixed martial arts fighter, UFC Heavyweight champion, former Light Heavyweight champion
 Isaiah Kacyvenski, football player
 Richie Karl, golfer
 Jon Kimmel, football player
 Steve Kraly, baseball player
 Joe LaRue, competitive eater 
 Sang Lee, taekwondo coach
 Johnny Logan, baseball player
 Ron Luciano, baseball umpire, author of The Umpire Strikes Back
 Frank LoVuolo, football player
 Billy Martin, baseball player and manager
 Tamdan McCrory, mixed martial arts fighter
 Troy Nickerson, wrestler
 Hidy Ochiai, martial artist
 Mayumi Pejo, Olympic martial artist
 King Rice, basketball coach
 Chris Riley, soccer player
 Mike Rotunda, wrestler
 Jack Sharkey, World Heavyweight Champion boxer
 Matt Tanzini, soccer player
 Justin Topa, baseball player
 George S. Whitney, football coach
 Randy Will, Olympic bobsledder
 Jake Zumbach, football player

Business figures
 Jonathan Michael Ansell, international insurance company founder and CEO
 Joseph H. Boardman, CEO of Amtrak, administrator of Federal Railroad Administration
 Faisal Farooqui, founder and CEO; MouthShut.com, attended Binghamton University
 Jeff Gaspin, television executive, attended Binghamton University
 George Hull, tobacconist and Cardiff Giant hoaxer
 George F. Johnson, co-owner of Endicott Johnson Corporation
 Willis Sharpe Kilmer, promoter of Swamp Root patent medicine and thoroughbred owner
 Geraldine MacDonald, vice president of America Online
 Matt Ouimet, executive chairman of Cedar Fair, former president of Disneyland resort, attended Binghamton University
 John D. Rockefeller, founder of Standard Oil
 Thomas Secunda, founder of Bloomberg L.P., attended Binghamton University
 Edward W. Stack, CEO of Dick's Sporting Goods
 Gustav Stickley, furniture manufacturer, prominent promoter of American Craftsman movement
 Bob Swan, CEO of Intel
 Oliver Treyz, television executive
 Thomas Tull, CEO of Legendary Pictures, part owner of the Pittsburgh Steelers
 Jay Walder, chairman and CEO of the Metropolitan Transportation Authority, MTA in New York City, attended Binghamton University
 Thomas J. Watson, Sr., founder and president of International Business Machines (IBM)
 Adam Weitsman, entrepreneur and philanthropist

Lawyers and jurists
 Elaine D. Kaplan, judge, United States Court of Federal Claims, attended Binghamton University
 Barbara M. Lynn, judge
 Ellis Rubin,  attorney
 Jerome B. Simandle, judge
 Lorenzo P. Williston, judge and politician

Military figures
 Joseph J. Bartlett, brigadier general and diplomat
 Joseph Brant, Mohawk military leader
 John Francis Burnes, marine officer
 Daniel Bursch, astronaut
 Douglas G. Hurley, astronaut
 David Ireland, colonel
 Brett James McMullen, Brigadier General, USAF Retired, Windsor Central High School graduate
 Lawrence D. Peters, marine, Medal of Honor recipient
 John C. Robinson, major general, Medal of Honor recipient
 Lester R. Stone, Jr., sergeant, Medal of Honor recipient
 Douglas H. Wheelock, astronaut

Musicians
 Frederick Ayres, composer
 Corky Cornelius, jazz trumpeter
 Fred Coury, drummer
 Steve Davis, jazz trombonist
 Dena DeRose, jazz pianist and singer
 Andy Grammer, singer/songwriter, attended Binghamton University
 Chris Griffin, jazz trumpeter
 John Hollenbeck, jazz drummer and composer
 Robert Jager, composer
 Richard Leech, opera tenor
 Tim Malchak, singer/songwriter
 Ingrid Michaelson, singer/songwriter, attended Binghamton University
 Elmar Oliveira, violinist
 Steve Perry, singer/guitarist for the Cherry Poppin' Daddies
 Lee Ranaldo, guitarist for Sonic Youth, attended Binghamton University
 Stephen Roessner, Grammy Award-winning recording engineer, drummer for Saxon Shore
 Slam Stewart, jazz bassist
 Gary Wilson, performance artist

Politicians
 Morteza Agha-Tehrani, Iranian Parliament member
 Warren M. Anderson, state senator
 Bill Aswad, Vermont state legislator
 William H. Austin, Wisconsin state legislator
 Orlow W. Chapman, U.S. Solicitor General
 Daniel S. Dickinson, U.S. senator
 Steven Fulop, mayor of Jersey City, New Jersey, attended Binghamton University
 Edwin Arthur Hall, congressman
 Robert Harpur, state politician
 William Henry Hill, congressman
 Hakeem Jeffries, congressman, attended Binghamton University
 Thomas W. Libous, state senator
 John Liu, New York City comptroller and former councilman
 Donna Lupardo, state assemblywoman
 Tom McDonald, U.S. ambassador to Zimbabwe
 Daniel A. Mica, congressman
 John Mica, congressman
 Stephen C. Millard, congressman
 E. A. Mitchell, congressman
 Marshall F. Moore, governor
 Raymond Bartlett Stevens, congressman
 Randall Terry, founder of Operation Rescue
 Benjamin F. Tracy, Secretary of the Navy
 J. Ernest Wharton, congressman
 George H. Williston, Wisconsin state and territorial legislator
 Ivan Yermachenka, Belarusian politician, diplomat and writer; died in Binghamton

Writers and journalists
 Eric Appel, writer and director
 Bruce Benderson, author, attended Binghamton University
 Andrew Bergman, film director, screenwriter, novelist, attended Binghamton University
 Harvey Bullock, screenwriter, producer
 Steven Canals, screenwriter, producer, attended Binghamton University
 Tina Chang, poet, attended Binghamton University
 C. J. Chivers, journalist
 Jack Dann, science fiction author and editor
 Everett De Morier, novelist, author, humorist
 Nathan Englander, author, attended Binghamton University
 Jeffrey Ford, writer, attended Binghamton University
 Kate Gale, poet
 Amy Kim Ganter, author and illustrator
 John Gardner, novelist
 Howard R. Garis, author of Uncle Wiggily stories
 Don Goddard, radio and TV news reporter
 Stephen Kalinich, poet and songwriter
 Steven G. Kellman, author critic, attended Binghamton University
 Rob Kirkpatrick, author and editor, Binghamton University
 Steve Koren, screenwriter, attended Binghamton University
 David Ross Locke, aka Petroleum V. Nasby, journalist and early political commentator
 Peter Robinson, speechwriter for Ronald Reagan
 Pamela Sargent, science fiction author
 Davis Schneiderman, educator and author, attended Binghamton University
 David Sedaris, humorist and writer
 Dava Sobel, writer, attended Binghamton University
 Pete Van Wieren, play-by-play baseball commentator
 Jean Webster, author
 Donald E. Westlake, novelist, attended Binghamton University
 Suzanne Weyn, author, attended Binghamton University
 Jenna Wolfe, Today Show anchor
 George Zebrowski, science fiction author and editor

Others
 Alexander Aitchison, firefighter chief
 Joseph Barbara, mobster
 Frances M. Beal, activist
 Michael Dahulich, archbishop
 Gerald Nicholas Dino, fourth bishop of the Byzantine Catholic Eparchy of Phoenix
 Ben Eisenkop, Reddit personality, attended Binghamton University
 Ogarita Booth Henderson, daughter of Lincoln assassin John Wilkes Booth, buried in Binghamton's Glenwood Cemetery
 William L. Moore, civil rights activist

References

Binghamton, New York
Binghamton